1st New York Regiment
2nd New York Regiment
3rd New York Regiment
4th New York Regiment
5th New York Regiment